Elena Evgenievna Zaiatz (also transliterated Zayats; born 16 June 1969) is a Russian female chess player who holds the FIDE titles of International Master (2005) and Woman Grandmaster (1988). She has represented both Belarus and Russia at the international chess competitions. Elena Zaiatz represented Belarus in chess championships from 1986 to 2006 before heading to Russia. She went on to represent Russia at chess championships from 2007 to date. She graduated at the Belarusian State University.

Elena has represented Belarus at Chess Olympiads from 1994 to 1996. She went onto represent Russia at the 2006 Chess World Championship. Elena was a Belarusian National Chess Champion in 1988 and also won a bronze medal in the World U20 Chess Championship held in 1988.

See also 
 List of female chess players
 List of chess families

References

External links 
 
 Profile at Chessdb.com
 

1969 births
Living people
Belarusian female chess players
Russian female chess players
Chess woman grandmasters
Chess players from Minsk